The Main road 41 is a west–east direction First class main road in Hungary, that connects Nyíregyháza (the Main road 4 change) with Beregsurány (the border of Ukraine). Most of the traffic was taken over by the M3 motorway.

The road, as well as all other main roads in Hungary, is managed and maintained by Magyar Közút, state owned company.

See also

 Roads in Hungary

Sources

External links

 Hungarian Public Road Non-Profit Ltd. (Magyar Közút Nonprofit Zrt.)
 National Infrastructure Developer Ltd.

Main roads in Hungary
Szabolcs-Szatmár-Bereg County